The Freedom Ride of 1965 was a journey undertaken by a group of Aboriginal Australians in a bus across New South Wales, led by Charles Perkins. Its aim was to bring to the attention of the public the extent of racial discrimination in Australia, and it was a significant event in the history of civil rights for Indigenous Australians.

Description
Inspired by the Freedom Riders of the American Civil Rights Movement, in 1964 students from the University of Sydney formed a group called the Student Action for Aborigines, led by Charles Perkins (the first Indigenous Australian to graduate tertiary education) among others, and travelled into New South Wales country towns on what some of them considered a fact-finding mission. What they encountered was de facto segregation; the students protested, picketed, and faced violence, raising the issue of Indigenous rights. They commonly stood protesting for hours at segregated areas such as pools, parks and pubs which raised a mixed reception in the country towns. Australia overwhelmingly passed a 1967 referendum removing discriminatory sections from the Australian Constitution and enabling the federal government to take direct action in Aboriginal affairs.

At the time of the Freedom Ride in 1965, some Aboriginal People of Australia were counted separately in the census and their rights as citizens were regularly ignored. In 1964 a University of Sydney protest against racial segregation in the United States had brought comments from members of the public urging students to look to their own backyard if they wanted to draw attention to racial discrimination.

Participants
The original Freedom Riders were: Charles Perkins, Gary Williams, Aidan Foy, Alan Outhred, Alex Mills, Ann Curthoys, Barry Corr, Beth Hansen, Bob Gallagher, Brian Aarons, Chris Page, Colin Bradford, Darce Cassidy, Vince Copley, David Pepper, Derek Molloy, Hall Greenland, Helen Gray, Jim Spigelman, John Butterworth, John Gowdie, John Powles, Judith Rich, Louise Higham, Machteld Hali, Norm Mackay, Paddy Dawson, Pat Healy, Ray Leppik, Rick Collins, Robyn Iredale, Sue Johnston, Sue Reeves, Warwick Richards, and Wendy Golding.

Communities visited
The first two towns they went to were Wellington and Gulargambone. Protests were not conducted there. Instead the locals were asked questions which affirmed perceptions of how bad discrimination against Indigenous Australians was in rural areas.

Moving on to Walgett, some clear cases of racial discrimination were apparent. It proved to be the first real showdown for the Freedom Riders. They spent their first day conducting interviews to obtain information about segregation and racial discrimination and found that the cinema, the Returned Servicemen's League (RSL) club, the town's two hotels and a frock shop were all segregated. The Freedom Riders picketed the Walgett RSL club from noon until sunset, holding placards stating "Walgett: Australian's disgrace", "Bar the Colour Bar", "Good enough for Tobruk - why not Walgett RSL?". While their protest did little to change the attitudes of the townsfolk, they encouraged the Aboriginal community to push for change. Aboriginal people who participated in pickets were bitter at the ongoing discrimination they experienced in their town and they continued to protest and agitate for desegregation in the establishments that still upheld a colour ban after the protesters left. However, a report by Bruce Maxwell, a cadet reporter for The Herald, brought the SAFA Freedom Ride into the national spotlight. The Sydney Morning Herald and The Daily Mirror newspapers as well as TV and radio now began to report on the next stage of the Freedom Ride in Moree.

After leaving Walgett, an unidentified driver rammed the bus, forcing it off the road. Because cadet reporter Bruce Maxwell had come along, the incident made headlines in the Sydney Morning Herald, attracting the attention of international media.  Some reports compared the treatment of Aboriginal Australians to the racism and segregation in the Deep South of the United States.

Moree was the site of a violent conflict during the Freedom Ride when the students tried to assist children from a nearby reserve to enter the Moree Swimming Baths, and were obstructed by supporters of the race-ban.  At that time, Aboriginal people were not allowed in pubs or clubs or at the swimming pool, or to walk on the sidewalk, or play football in the local team. The local  cinema was segregated - Blacks had to sit in the front rows.  The Freedom Riders collected a number of children from the local mission, including nine-year-old Dan Moree (son of Lyall Munro Snr, brother of Lyall Munro Jnr], who was 13 at the time), and tried to gain entry into the Moree Swimming Baths. Lyall Munro Snr told NITV in 2017 that he and the Moree Aboriginal Advancement Committee had been fighting to change the town's segregationist by-laws for years before the Freedom Riders arrived, but not in a confrontational way. "...So we stood and watched in the crowd. It was their day and it was an ugly scene, pretty rowdy, pretty wild — a lot of violence". The event was widely covered by the media at home and internationally, and it caught the attention of the Australian public, proving to be a "seminal moment" in the history of Australia. A public meeting took place in the town afterwards, and the decision was taken to lift the colour bar on the pool.

Other towns that were visited include Lismore, Bowraville, Dubbo, and Kempsey.

Impact and legacy

During and immediate aftermath
The Freedom Ride resulted in Aboriginal children having full access to the Moree Baths and Swimming Pool.

Crux, the Australian Student Christian Movement journal, ran a special issue on "Aborigines", which included a guest editorial on the significance of the Freedom Ride. Cartoonists including John Frith also addressed the topic.

The New York Times and other overseas newspapers reported on the events.

Later that year, Perkins later related what happened to the 200 people attending the Federal Council for the Advancement of Aborigines and Torres Strait Islanders (FCAATSI) conference in Canberra.

Soon after the Freedom Ride, the NSW Aborigines Welfare Board announced that it would spend ₤65,000 on housing in Moree.

The Australian Black Power movement emerged in Redfern in Sydney, Fitzroy, Melbourne, and South Brisbane, following the Freedom Ride, and there followed a period of Aboriginal activism across Australia.

Perkins and other activists returned to Walgett later in to assist in the fight against the colour bar applied at the Oasis Hotel.

Ongoing impact
It opened the eyes of non-Indigenous Australians, especially those living in cities, the racial segregation that was occurring in their country, as well as revealing it to a world audience. is today remembered as a significant event in the history of civil rights for Indigenous Australians, and a turning point for race relations.  It has continued to serve as an inspiration for Aboriginal rights activists.

Re-enactments

2005
In 2005 another ride travelled through New South Wales. The aim was to determine how much had changed in 40 years and foster debate on reconciliation. Although the 2005 event focussed on reconciliation, experiences of discrimination were reported and the poor housing conditions for some Aboriginal People were noted. The Minister for Aboriginal Affairs Andrew Refshauge was presented with the findings of the 2005 ride which visited more than 13 communities.

2015
To mark the 50th anniversary of the Freedom Ride, two coaches re-ran the route with several of the original participants and a group of present-day University of Sydney students. This was featured in an episode of the SBS programme Living Black.

See also

Racism in Australia

References

External links

Collaborating for Indigenous Rights: Freedom Ride, 1965, National Museum of Australia
Ann Curthoys' diaries of the 1965 Freedom Ride

1965 protests
Conflicts in 1965
History of Indigenous Australians
Civil rights protests
History of New South Wales
1965 in Australia
Organisations serving Indigenous Australians
Protests in Australia
1960s in New South Wales
Moree Plains Shire
Anti-racism in Australia